Midila daphne is a moth in the family Crambidae. It was described by Druce in 1895. It is found in Mexico, Costa Rica and Colombia.

Subspecies
Midila daphne daphne (Mexico)
Midila daphne minor Munroe, 1970 (Colombia)

References

Moths described in 1895
Midilinae